Princess Bhaktra Bimalabarna (25 October 1854 - 18 October 1909) was a Princess of Siam (later Thailand). She was a member of Siamese royal family and is a daughter of King Mongkut and Consort Phae Dharmasaroja.

Her mother was Chao Chom Manda Pae Thamsaroj (is a daughter of Ao Thamsaroj and Si Thamsaroj) She was given the full name of Phra Chao Borom Wong Ther Phra Ong Chao Bhaktra Bimalabarna. She had 3 siblings 1 elder sister and 2 younger brother and 1 younger sister:

 Princess Yingyaovalakshana
 Princess Bhaktra Bimalabarna
 Prince Kashemsanta Sobhaga
 Prince Manusyanagamanop (later Vajirananavarorasa)
 Princess Banchob Benchama

Princess Bhakta Bimalabarna died on 18 October 1909 at the age 54.

Ancestry

References 

1854 births
1909 deaths
19th-century Chakri dynasty
19th-century Thai women
20th-century Thai women
20th-century Chakri dynasty
Children of Mongkut
Thai female Phra Ong Chao
People from Bangkok
Daughters of kings